César Campaniço (born 31 March 1980) is a Portuguese racing driver.

He was born in Lisbon, and is best known for his appearances in the Portuguese Touring Car Championship.

Career

Racing record

Career summary

† – As Campaniço was a guest driver, he was ineligible for points.

Complete Formula 3 Euro Series results
(key)

FIA GT Series results

External links
 
 

1980 births
Living people
Sportspeople from Lisbon
Portuguese racing drivers
Formula Renault V6 Eurocup drivers
A1 Team Portugal drivers
Euroformula Open Championship drivers
Formula 3 Euro Series drivers
Italian Formula Renault 2.0 drivers
Formula Renault Eurocup drivers
Formula BMW ADAC drivers
German Formula Three Championship drivers
Italian Formula Three Championship drivers
French Formula Three Championship drivers
European Le Mans Series drivers
Eurocup Mégane Trophy drivers
International GT Open drivers
ADAC GT Masters drivers
European Touring Car Cup drivers
Prema Powerteam drivers
A1 Grand Prix drivers
Cram Competition drivers
Signature Team drivers
Team Rosberg drivers
World Touring Car Championship drivers
Drivex drivers
Carlin racing drivers
Engstler Motorsport drivers